Pseudomurraytrematoides is a genus of monopisthocotylean monogeneans, belonging to the family Diplectanidae.

Species
According to the World Register of Marine Species, there is a single species in the genus:

 Pseudomurraytrematoides pricei (Caballero, Bravo-Hollis & Grocott, 1955) Domingues & Boeger, 2008 

Pseudomurraytrematoides pricei is a parasite of the Red pike conger Cynoponticus coniceps (Muraenesocidae) off the Pacific coast of Panama.

References

Diplectanidae
Monogenea genera
Parasites of fish